Gopal Singh (born 14 November 1976) is an Indian film, television and theatre actor. Singh is majorly known for his power packed performances and unconventional roles in Hindi films. His major work includes Company, Calcutta Mail, Ek Haseena Thi, Traffic Signal, Page 3, Mumbai Mirror and Buddha in a Traffic Jam, amongst many others. He is also known for portraying many unusual roles on Indian television, biggest one being Birbal in Balaji Telefilms' epic love saga Jodha Akbar.

Singh started his acting career in 1997 in Sahitya Kala Parishad repertory, learning and teaching stage productions and theatre plays. Subsequently, Singh moved base to Mumbai and started his career in mainstream Indian television and film industry.

Television

Filmography

Web series

References

External links 
 

Indian male film actors
1976 births
Living people
Indian male television actors
Male actors from Delhi